Piccadilly College (formerly Aitchison College) was a UK based further education provider, situated in the heart of Manchester.

History 
The college was formed 18 July 2013 as Aitchison College. It was renamed Piccadilly College on 25 July 2013 and was closed on 1 March 2016.

The college taught English as a Foreign Language, with their advertising targeting Spanish-speaking pupils.

References

External links

Further education colleges in Manchester
Educational institutions established in 2013
Educational institutions disestablished in 2016
Defunct schools in Manchester